Chrysoteuchia disasterella is a moth in the family Crambidae. It was described by Stanisław Błeszyński in 1965. It is found in Shaanxi, China.

References

Crambini
Moths described in 1965
Moths of Asia